Draba sharsmithii is an uncommon species of flowering plant in the family Brassicaceae known by the common names Mt. Whitney draba and Sharsmith's draba.

Description
Draba sharsmithii is a small perennial herb forming dense mats or cushions of hairy, oval-shaped leaves each no more than a centimeter long. The erect inflorescence bears several yellow flowers. The fruit is a twisted, lance-shaped silique up to 2 centimeters long containing several unwinged seeds.

Distribution
Draba sharsmithii is endemic to the southern Sierra Nevada of California, where it is known from fewer than ten occurrences in rocky alpine and subalpine habitat.

See also
Carl Sharsmith

External links
Jepson Manual Treatment - Draba sharsmithii
USDA Plants Profile
Flora of North America
Draba sharsmithii - Photo gallery

sharsmithii
Endemic flora of California
Flora of the Sierra Nevada (United States)
Plants described in 1991
Critically endangered flora of California